The 2017–18 season was Accrington Stanley's twelfth consecutive season in League Two and their 49th year in existence. Along with competing in League Two, the club also participated in the FA Cup, EFL Cup and EFL Trophy. The season covers the period from 1 July 2017 to 30 June 2018.

Transfers

Transfers in

Transfers out

Loans in

Loans out

Competitions

Pre-season friendlies

As of 8 June 2017, Accrington Stanley have announced five pre-season friendlies against Southport, Preston North End, Oldham Athletic, Huddersfield Town and Everton XI.

League Two

League table

Result summary

Results by matchday

Matches

On 21 June 2017, the league fixtures were announced.

August

September

October

November

December

January

February

March

April

May

FA Cup

EFL Cup

On 16 June 2017, Accrington Stanley were drawn at home to Preston North End in the first round. Stanley were home again for the second round, facing Premier League side West Bromwich Albion.

EFL Trophy

On 28 July 2017, Stanley announced their group stage schedule.

Player Stats

Appearances

Numbers in parentheses denote appearances as substitute.

Goalscorers
Includes all competitive matches.

Disciplinary record

References

Accrington Stanley
Accrington Stanley F.C. seasons